Simonton Creek is a stream in the U.S. state of Indiana.

Simonton Creek was named after John Simonton, an early settler.

See also
List of rivers of Indiana

References

Rivers of Miami County, Indiana
Rivers of Wabash County, Indiana
Rivers of Indiana